Liou Yuh-Ju (born on 25 June 1963) is a Taiwanese sport shooter. She competed in rifle shooting events at the 1988 Summer Olympics.

Olympic results

References

1963 births
Living people
ISSF rifle shooters
Taiwanese female sport shooters
Shooters at the 1988 Summer Olympics
Olympic shooters of Taiwan